Mihai Gheorghe Mateș (born 11 December 2000) is a Romanian professional footballer who plays as a forward for Gaz Metan Mediaș.

References

External links
 

2000 births
Living people
People from Mediaș
Romanian footballers
Association football forwards
Liga I players
CS Gaz Metan Mediaș players
Liga III players
CSM Unirea Alba Iulia players